Chun Lung (1852 – August 11, 1889) was a Chinese businessman in the Hawaiian Kingdom. He sometimes used his father's Hawaiianized surname and was known as C. L. Afong. He was also known as Alung or Ah Lung using the common Cantonese diminutive prefix Ah before his given name.

Early life 
Alung was born in 1852, in the village of Kai Sheong-san, Zhuhai, Guangdong. He was the eldest son of Chun Afong and his primary kit-fat wife, Lee Hong. His father resided in Honolulu where he became the first Chinese millionaire in Hawaii and traveled intermittently between the islands and China. Alung had two full brothers and sixteen half-siblings from his father's second marriage to Julia Fayerweather Afong, a British-Hawaiian woman of aliʻi (noble) descent.

His father Chun Afong and half-brother Toney (Chun Chik-yu) returned to China in June 1862. Chun Afong left his Hawaiian-born son to live with Lee Hong and his family in Meixi and took Alung back to Hawaii to raise in each other's respective culture for the next seven years. Afong returned to China in 1869 with Alung to retrieve Toney.

Education 
Back in Honolulu, Alung was instructed in the English language by either Anglican missionary Rev. Edmund Ibbotson or Charles William Turner at ʻIolani School (called St. Alban's College). He later studied at Punahou School (called Oahu College).

Both brothers were prepared for college at Hartford Public High School in Connecticut. Alung later enrolled in Yale University under the tutelage of Yung Wing. He was part of the class of 1879. During his junior year at Yale, Alung won an oratory prize with his essay titled "The Educational Element in Chinese Civilization".

Career 
After graduating from Yale, he was employed at the Chinese Legation at Washington, D.C., as an interpreter. In 1886–87, he was appointed as Special Commissioner by the Qing Dynasty government to inquire into the Coolie trade in Peru. He was awarded a tract of land and the decoration of the "White Button" by the Guangxu Emperor.

Around 1884, Alung returned to Hawaii to help his father manage his Hawaiian business interests. In 1886–87, he was involved in the so-called Aki opium scandal, an infamous bribery scandal involving King Kalākaua and his subordinate Junius Kaʻae who promised a government license to sell opium to Chinese businessman Tong Kee (Aki) after a bribe of $75,000. Despite the bribe, Alung was awarded the license and Aki demanded the return of the money. When the king refused Aki brought a lawsuit against the king.

Alung became seriously ill while on a business trip between Honolulu and the Pepeekeo Plantation on the island of Hawaii. Although given medical treatment on Maui, he died on August 11, 1889, of peritonitis, after he returned to Honolulu.

Alung married Ung See Soy and had three children: Chan Mui-Ngan, Chan Wing-On and an unnamed child.

See also 
Chinese immigration to Hawaii

Notes

References

Bibliography 

1852 births
1889 deaths
Businesspeople from Guangdong
Chinese expatriates in the Hawaiian Kingdom
Chinese merchants
People from Zhuhai
People from Honolulu
ʻIolani School alumni
Punahou School alumni
Yale University alumni
Hawaiian Kingdom businesspeople